Woongarrah is a suburb of the Central Coast region of New South Wales, Australia. It is part of the  local government area, as well as part of the Warnervale development precinct.

It consists mainly of paddocks and rural properties, yet over the recent years, it has been urbanised, with housing estates being established, much like the neighbouring suburb Hamlyn Terrace as well as a planned railway station, and prominent town centre. The closest shopping centres to Woongarrah are Lakehaven Shopping Centre and Westfield Tuggerah.

Schools
 Lakes Grammar
 Woongarrah Public School
 Mackillop Catholic College
 Wadalba High School
 Warnervale Public School

References

Suburbs of the Central Coast (New South Wales)